Al-Nahdha Sport Club, is an Iraqi football team based in Karrada, Baghdad, that plays in the Iraq Division Three.

History
Al-Nahdha team was promoted to the Iraqi Premier League in the 2005–06 season, but withdrew from the league because they did not have an independent stadium.

Managerial history
 Sabah Abdul-Jalil
 Saadi Toma
 Jassim Hameed Segar
 Jabbar Hameed  
 Nasser Noumy
 Sultan Ghafil
 Fadhel Luaibi

See also
 1999–2000 Iraq FA Cup
 2001–02 Iraq FA Cup
 2002–03 Iraq FA Cup

References

External links
 Al-Nahdha SC on Goalzz.com
 Iraq Clubs- Foundation Dates

1958 establishments in Iraq
Association football clubs established in 1958
Football clubs in Baghdad